After the death of Shah Rukh, Gawhar Shad allowed Abdal-Latif Mirza to be the commander of his army despite reservations of the Tarkhans as well as the reservations of Baysunghur Mirza's sons, especially Abul-Qasim Babur Mirza who was present there at the camp. Gawhar Shad wanted to please Ulugh Beg but at the same time encouraged the Baysunghur brothers to rebel. She contacted Ala al-Dawla Mirza at Herat conveying her sentiments. Therefore, Abul-Qasim Babur Mirza along with Khalil Sultan, son of Muhammad Jahangir and a daughter of Shah Rukh along with their troops raided the Urdu Bazar or Camp Market and went on towards Ala al-Dawla Mirza at Herat. As soon as Abdal-Latif Mirza got his army in order after several executions he marched towards Damghan and on his way imprisoned Gawhar Shad his grandmother and the Tarkhans.

Timurid civil wars
Herat
Medieval Khorasan
Samarkand
Conflicts in 1447
1447 in Asia